Charles-Édouard is a masculine given name. Notable people with the name include:

 Charles-Édouard Brown-Séquard (1817–1894), Mauritian-born physiologist and neurologist
 Charles-Édouard Campeau (born 1916), Canadian engineer
 Charles-Édouard Coridon (born 1973), French-Martiniquais football midfielder
 Charles-Édouard Houde (1823–1912), Canadian politician
 Charles-Édouard Lefebvre (1843–1917), French composer

Compound given names
French masculine given names